Xylosma kaalaensis is a species of flowering plant in the family Salicaceae. It is endemic to New Caledonia.

References

kaalaensis
Endemic flora of New Caledonia
Vulnerable plants
Taxa named by Hermann Otto Sleumer
Taxonomy articles created by Polbot